Twelve men's teams competed in basketball at the 1992 Summer Olympics.

Group A

Angola

Brazil

Croatia

Germany

Spain

United States

Group B

Australia

China

Lithuania

Puerto Rico

Unified Team

Venezuela

References

1992